Jude Gallagher is an Irish boxer. He competed at the 2022 Commonwealth Games, winning the gold medal in the men's featherweight event. Gallagher defeated Joseph Commey in the final match in the boxing competition.

References

External links 

Living people
Place of birth missing (living people)
Year of birth missing (living people)
Irish male boxers
Flyweight boxers
Light-flyweight boxers
Boxers at the 2022 Commonwealth Games
Commonwealth Games medallists in boxing
Commonwealth Games gold medallists for Northern Ireland
Medallists at the 2022 Commonwealth Games